Isu Group is a large South Korean chaebol (conglomerate), with subsidiaries in the chemical, industry, financial, petroleum and automotive fields. It is headquartered in Banpo-dong, Seocho-gu, Seoul, and was established in 1996. The CEO is Kim Sang-beom, a J.D. and M.B.A. graduate of the University of Michigan.

Subsidiaries
Isu Corporation
Isu Chemical Company
Isu Constructions
Isu Petasys
Isu Oil Marketing Sales
Isu Venture Capital
Isu Business Systems
Isu Abxis
Isu Ubcare
Isu Exachem
Isu Exaboard
Total-Isu Oil Company
Isu C&E

See also
Economy of South Korea
Chaebol
List of South Korean companies
Total S.A. - Total-Isu Oil Company licensed companies

External links
Main
Isu Group Homepage 
Group
Isu Corporation
Isu Chemical Company
Isu Constructions
Isu Petasys
Isu Oil Marketing Sales
Isu Venture Capital
Isu Business Systems
Isu Abxis
Isu Ubcare
Isu Exachem
Isu Exaboard
Total-Isu Oil Company

Chaebol
Companies based in Seoul
Companies established in 1996